Barbara Fletcher (born 15 May 1943) is an Australian gymnast. She competed in six events at the 1964 Summer Olympics.

References

1943 births
Living people
Australian female artistic gymnasts
Olympic gymnasts of Australia
Gymnasts at the 1964 Summer Olympics
Place of birth missing (living people)
20th-century Australian women